The Precision 23 is an American trailerable sailboat, that was designed by Jim Taylor.

Production
The boat was first built by Precision Boat Works in the United States in 1986 and remained in production until 2018. Over 500 examples were completed.

Design

The Precision 23 is a small recreational keelboat, built predominantly of fiberglass, with teak wood trim. It has a fractional sloop rig, a transom-hung rudder and a fixed stub keel with a retractable centerboard that is raised and lowered by a Dacron line, plus a "kick-up" rudder. It displaces  and carries  of lead ballast.

The boat is constructed using a hand-laid fiberglassing method and sleeps four adults. The galley includes a stainless steel sink, an alcohol-fired stove and a self-contained fresh water system, with a manual pump. A  Igloo Coolers ice chest with a teak wood step is also standard equipment.

The boat is normally fitted with a small  outboard motor for docking and maneuvering.

The design has sleeping accommodation for five people, with a double "V"-berth in the bow cabin, two straight settees in the main cabin and an aft quarter berth on the port side. The galley is located on the starboard side just behind the companionway ladder. The galley is equipped with a two-burner stove and a sink. The head is located under the bow cabin "V"-berth.

Operational history
In a 2010 review Steve Henkel wrote, "In 1994, former Precision sales manager, the late Larry Norris, gave me his own description of the traditional, shoal-draft Precision 23 when I was writing a review of the boat for Practical Sailor. He said that 'the 23 has never been anything it wasn't originally intended to be: a trailerable sailboat of better than average cruising performance, but never a racing machine. It is too full forward and cut away aft to achieve really staggering downwind performance. But on the other hand, the boat will stay balanced in a blow with just a couple of fingers on the tiller.' Our tests at the time bore out his assertions. Best features: Attractive traditional design, solid construction, adequately stable and weatherly, open and airy cabin with better-than-average space ... good and caring customer service, and a well-satisfied and loyal owner group. Worst features: Nothing significant to report."

See also

List of sailing boat types

Similar sailboats
Beneteau First 235
Bluenose one-design sloop
Hunter 23
O'Day 23
Paceship 23
Paceship PY 23
Rob Roy 23
Schock 23
Sonic 23
Starwind 223
Stone Horse
Watkins 23

References

External links

Keelboats
1980s sailboat type designs
Sailing yachts
Trailer sailers
Sailboat type designs by Jim Taylor Yacht Designs
Sailboat types built by Precision Boat Works